Félize Regnard (1424-1474) was a French courtier. She was a lady-in-waiting to the queen of France, Charlotte of Savoy, and mistress to king Louis XI of France.

She was the daughter of Aymar Reynard, seigneur de Saint Didier, and married to Jean Pic (d. 1452). She became a lady-in-waiting as a widow and had the daughter Guyette de Valois with Louis XI. She remarried Charles de Seillons.

References

Sources

1424 deaths
1474 deaths
15th-century French people
French ladies-in-waiting
Mistresses of French royalty